Guy Stuart Ritchie (born 10 September 1968)  is an English film director, producer and screenwriter. His work includes British gangster films, and the Sherlock Holmes films starring Robert Downey Jr.

Ritchie left school at age 15 and worked entry-level jobs in the film industry before going on to direct television commercials. In 1995, he directed a short film, The Hard Case, followed by the crime comedy Lock, Stock and Two Smoking Barrels (1998), his feature-length directorial debut. He gained recognition with his second film, Snatch (2000), which found critical and commercial success. Following Snatch, Ritchie directed Swept Away (2002), a critically panned box-office bomb starring Madonna, to whom Ritchie was married between 2000 and 2008. He went on to direct Revolver (2005) and RocknRolla (2008), which were less successful and received mixed reviews. In 2009 and 2011, he directed two box-office hits, Sherlock Holmes and its sequel, Sherlock Holmes: A Game of Shadows, respectively. The former was nominated for Academy Awards in Best Original Score and Best Art Direction.

His other directed motion pictures are The Man From U.N.C.L.E. (2015), which is a remake of a 1960s spy series, King Arthur: Legend of the Sword (2017) and the live-action adaptation of Disney's Aladdin (2019). Aladdin earned more than $1 billion worldwide, becoming one of the highest-grossing films in 2019, and the 34th highest-grossing film of all-time during its theatrical run. In 2020, he returned to crime comedy with The Gentlemen (2019), which was mostly well received and a commercial success. In 2021, he directed Jason Statham in the action film Wrath of Man. His thirteenth feature, Operation Fortune: Ruse de Guerre, initially set for 2022, released in March 2023.

Life and career

1968–1997: Early life and career beginnings 
Ritchie was born in Hatfield, Hertfordshire, the second of two children of Amber ( Parkinson) and Captain John Vivian Ritchie (b. 1928), former Seaforth Highlanders serviceman and advertising executive. He has an older sister, Tabitha, and a half-brother, Kevin, who was born to Amber Parkinson and put up for adoption.

Both of Ritchie's parents remarried. His father's second marriage was to Shireen Ritchie, Baroness Ritchie of Brompton, a former model and later Conservative politician and life peer. Between 1973 and 1980, Ritchie's mother was married to Sir Michael Leighton, 11th Baronet of Loton Park. As a divorcée, she is styled as Amber, Lady Leighton.

Ritchie is dyslexic, and attended Windlesham House School in West Sussex and Stanbridge Earls School in Hampshire. He was expelled from school at aged 15. He has claimed that drug use was the reason for expulsion, although Ritchie's father said he was "cutting class and entertaining a girl in his room".

1998–2002: Breakthrough 
After Ritchie's first project on a short film, The Hard Case (1995), in 1998, Ritchie met Matthew Vaughn, godson of Peter Morton, co-founder of the Hard Rock Cafe chain. Vaughn had been working in Los Angeles and expressed interest in producing Ritchie's directorial debut, Lock, Stock and Two Smoking Barrels (1998). It took 15 months to secure financial backing. Trudie Styler served as an executive producer—she said "I've always liked bad-boy movies".

The production of crime comedy heist Lock, Stock and Two Smoking Barrels was completed in about eight months. Starring Nick Moran, Jason Statham, Jason Flemyng and Dexter Fletcher, the film exposed them to worldwide audiences, and launched the acting career of former footballer Vinnie Jones. It was released in the United Kingdom on 28 August 1998 to critical and commercial success, with Janet Maslin of The New York Times praising Ritchie's "brash, ebullient direction" and "punchy little flourishes that load this English gangster film". The feature earned $28.1 million at the worldwide box office. At the 1999 British Academy Film Awards (BAFTAs), Lock, Stock and Two Smoking Barrels was nominated for three awards: Outstanding British Film, Best Editing and Outstanding Debut by a British Writer, Director or Producer for Vaughn. The film won a BAFTA for Film of the Year. In response to the film's success, Ritchie created a spin-off television series called Lock, Stock.... in 2000.

Ritchie's next film was Snatch (2000), another crime-comedy about a group of criminals searching for a stolen diamond. Starring an ensemble cast including Benicio del Toro, Dennis Farina, Jason Flemyng, Vinnie Jones, Brad Pitt, Rade Šerbedžija and Jason Statham. Similar to Lock, Stock and Two Smoking Barrels, the film depicted events from different characters' perspectives; a narrative device which he would use in later films. Snatch was released on 23 August 2000 to a commercial success at the box office, grossing more than $83 million worldwide. Mick LaSalle, writing for San Francisco Chronicle, was impressed with Ritchie's directing and "sequences that discharge with energy", but felt the writing could have been better. Film critic Roger Ebert describes Ritchie as a "zany, high-energy director" but felt the film's plot "doesn't build and it doesn't arrive anywhere".

In 2001, Ritchie directed a music video for "What It Feels Like for a Girl", a song performed by Madonna, to whom Ritchie was married at the time. In the video, she commits criminal and violent acts towards men; music channels MTV and VH1 banned the video from their rotation, opting to play it only once on the release date. Ritchie directed a short film starring Madonna and Clive Owen, titled Star for season one of The Hire, a 2001 online series to promote BMW automobiles. Ritchie's next film, starring Madonna and Adriano Giannini, was Swept Away (2002), a remake of Lina Wertmüller's 1974 Italian film of the same name. It is a romantic comedy about a wealthy socialite who is shipwrecked on a deserted island with a Communist sailor. The film was a critical and commercial failure, with an average rating of 5% on film review aggregator Rotten Tomatoes. Almar Haflidason of the BBC was critical of the lead actors, writing, "[Madonna] has neither good comedic sense nor any warmth [...] as for Giannini, he spends the first half of the movie endlessly complaining like some old fishwife". The feature won five awards at the 2002 Golden Raspberry Awards for Worst Picture, Worst Actress, Worst Screen Couple, Worst Remake or Sequel and Worst Director.

In 2002, Ritchie conceived a prank show titled Swag, for Channel 5 in the United Kingdom.

2003–2015: Critical disappointments and Sherlock Holmes 

After a two-year hiatus, Ritchie returned to directing his next heist film. Revolver (2005), starred Jason Statham, it was their third collaboration. Also cast were Ray Liotta, Vincent Pastore and André Benjamin. The story is about a gambler called Jake Green (Statham), who is released from prison and seeks revenge on those who stole his money. Filming was completed in late 2004 and the film premiered at the 2005 Toronto International Film Festival. Revolver was released in the United Kingdom on 22 September 2005; the film was critically panned and a commercial failure. Simon Guerrier of FilmFocus, gave Revolver 1 out of 5 stars, calling it, "tedious, humourless, pretentious and nasty". Adrian Hennigan from the BBC wrote, "the cheeky charm [of his previous films] has been replaced by plodding pretentiousness in a film that's illuminated by great action set-pieces and some powerful performances, but not redeemed". Ritchie responded to the criticism by stating, "I don't think anything went wrong with Revolver. By its very nature it's an esoteric movie. It's not designed for the masses". Budgeted at $27 million, the film earned $7.1 million at the worldwide box office. In 2007, Revolver was re-edited and released for the United States.

In 2008, Ritchie directed RocknRolla, for which he also wrote the screenplay. Set in London, it tells the story of a crew of gangsters, a rock star and some powerful players, all connected to each other throughout the film. It stars Gerard Butler, Tom Wilkinson, Thandie Newton, Mark Strong, Idris Elba, Tom Hardy, and Toby Kebbell. RocknRolla was released on 5 September 2008 in the United Kingdom, reaching number one at the UK box office in its first week of release. It was generally well received; Rotten Tomatoes gave the film a 60% rating, stating, "Mixed reviews for Guy Ritchie's return to his London-based cockney wideboy gangster movie roots, but most agree, it's a step in the right direction following two major turkeys". In that same year, Ritchie directed a television commercial for Nike called "Take It To The Next Level", about a young Dutch footballer who signs for Arsenal, showing the progression of his career from the beginning, through to his debut for the Netherlands. The commercial includes appearances from Cristiano Ronaldo, Cesc Fàbregas, Ronaldinho, Wayne Rooney, and Ruud van Nistelrooy.

Ritchie's next directorial effort was Sherlock Holmes (2009), based on the character of the same name created by Sir Arthur Conan Doyle. Starring Robert Downey Jr. and Jude Law, the film was released on 25 and 26 December 2009 in the United States and United Kingdom, respectively. Sherlock Holmes was a box-office hit, taking more than $520 million worldwide, and garnered mixed to favourable reviews from critics and general viewers. The feature received multiple accolades, including two Academy Award nominations for Best Original Score and Best Art Direction, and Downey won a Golden Globe Award for Best Actor. In 2011, Ritchie directed the sequel, Sherlock Holmes: A Game of Shadows. Released on 16 December, the film was a commercial success, grossing more than $545 million worldwide. A. O. Scott of The New York Times praised Ritchie for "taking liberties" with the characters, and writes that both films depict "a smoky, overcast Victorian world, infuses it with an air of jocular, hairy laddishness and stages a lot of fights in fussy and tiresome slow motion".

In 2012, Ritchie produced a trailer for the video game Call of Duty: Black Ops II. In 2013, he directed a commercial for H&M featuring David Beckham. A year later, he directed a commercial for whisky brand Haig, which also stars Beckham. He made a return to film in 2015, with The Man From U.N.C.L.E., a remake of the 1960s spy series of the same name. The screenplay, written by Ritchie and collaborator Lionel Wigram, tells the story of a CIA and a KGB agent who work together to stop a criminal organisation from constructing a nuclear weapon. A number of actors were considered for the lead roles, with Henry Cavill and Armie Hammer eventually being cast. Principal photography commenced in 2013 in London and Italy, with rewrites to the script during filming. The film was released on 14 August 2015 by Warner Bros. to a mixed critical reception from critics. Glenn Kenny, writing for RogerEbert.com opined, "[the film] is only intermittently engaging and amusing, and those portions of the movie that succeed are also frustrating. Because they're cushioned by enervated, conceptually befuddled, and sometimes outright indifferent stuff". However, he praised Hugh Grant's performance which "saves the movie".

2016–present: Disney collaboration and crime films 
In January 2014, Warner Bros. hired Ritchie to direct the first of six films in a franchise, fantasy adventure King Arthur: Legend of the Sword (2017) with Charlie Hunnam portraying King Arthur. The feature was released in 2D and 3D on 12 May 2017 in the United States, and a week later in the United Kingdom. Despite high expectations from the film studio, it was a box-office failure, causing large financial losses for Warner Bros. and Village Roadshow Pictures. King Arthur: Legend of the Sword received mixed reviews from critics and the subsequent sequels were cancelled.

In August 2017, Ritchie received the Raindance Auteur Award for his contributions to the British film industry. Next, Ritchie directed Disney's live-action adaptation of Aladdin (2019), based on the 1992 animated film of the same name. The plot follows Aladdin, a street urchin, as he falls in love with Princess Jasmine, befriends a Genie, and battles the wicked Jafar. Released on 24 May 2019 in the United States, the film was a commercial success despite mixed reviews; Aladdin earned more than $1 billion worldwide, becoming one of the highest-grossing films in 2019, and the 34th highest-grossing film of all-time during its theatrical run. Writing for the Chicago Sun-Times, Richard Roeper gave the film 3 out of 4 stars, praising Will Smith, Naomi Scott, and Mena Massoud's performances. On Metacritic, Aladdin has a weighted average score of 53 out of 100 based on 50 critics, indicating "mixed or average reviews", and on Rotten Tomatoes, the film holds an approval rating of 57% based on 372 reviews with an average rating of 5.88/10.

In 2020, Ritchie returned to crime comedy with The Gentlemen. The story is about an American expat who tries to sell his marijuana business, which triggers a chain reaction response from various criminals. Released on 1 January in the United Kingdom, and a few weeks later in other countries, the film was generally well received. Anton Bitel of Sight & Sound wrote that it "returns to the sense and sensibilities of his earliest features". Film critic James Berardinelli gave the film 3 out of four stars, writing, "The Gentlemen takes Ritchie back to his roots" although "the screenplay is too clever by half, with some of the quirkiness being awkward and intrusive." On Rotten Tomatoes, the film gained an approval rating of 74% based on 260 reviews, and earned $115 million worldwide.

Ritchie next directed the action thriller Wrath of Man, a remake of the 2004 film Cash Truck, starring Jason Statham, which was released in theatres in the United States on May 7, 2021. It was initially set for theatrical release in the United Kingdom by Lionsgate UK, but was instead released straight to streaming on Amazon Prime Video on December 10, 2021. In September 2020 Variety magazine reported that Ritchie and Statham would be collaborating on a spy thriller called Five Eyes, but later titled Operation Fortune: Ruse de Guerre. It was scheduled for release in theatres on March 18, 2022, but was pulled from the schedule a month prior without an explanation. In February 2021, Ritchie signed on to direct and write a World War II film titled The Ministry of Ungentlemanly Warfare, based on the book by Damien Lewis, for producer Jerry Bruckheimer and Paramount Pictures. In October 2022, Henry Cavill and Eiza González were cast in the lead roles, with Paramount no longer involved. 

Ritchie began filming his next film, a war drama titled The Covenant starring Jake Gyllenhaal, Dar Salim, Antony Starr and Emily Beecham, in February 2022 in Alicante, Spain. In June of that year, it was announced that Ritchie had signed on to direct a live-action film adaptation of Disney's Hercules.

Filmmaking

Influences and style 
Ritchie has cited Quentin Tarantino and Sergio Leone as influences on his work. However, he has stated "just about every film — any good film — that's ever been made has had an influence on me. But then how much of it, I have no idea". He has complimented several films including The Long Good Friday (1980), The Good, the Bad, and the Ugly (1966), Seven Samurai (1954) and Once Upon a Time in the West (1968). When asked about the influence of criminals Ronald and Reginald Kray, Ritchie states "It's inevitable ... everything, more or less, of the old-school villainy related back to the Krays at some point. And the Krays were a lot worse than everyone thinks they are. ... And I know what those boys were doing was a hundred times worse than what everyone thought was going on. So it's inevitable that anything that is genuine, and old, and British will somehow have something to do with the Krays".

Ritchie's films often incorporate memorable and "colourful" characters, for instance, Irish boxer Mickey O'Neil in Snatch, and crime boss "Hatchet" Harry in Lock, Stock, and Two Smoking Barrels. In his crime films, there is also fragmented dialogue, with many characters behaving menacingly and using cockney slang. The portrayal of the British class system has also been explored. Costume designer for The Gentlemen, Michael Wilkinson, said "Each character has an iconic, memorable look — a little larger than life".

Fast-paced and energetic action scenes serve as cinematic choices, as well as placing his characters in combat or violent situations. Ritchie has used fast-cutting and slow motion to build momentum in the story, and to create a high-impact viewing experience, respectively. He is also known to use interweaving stories and a non-linear narrative such as a circular plot in his films; this is found in the case of Snatch, Lock, Stock, and Two Smoking Barrels and Sherlock Holmes.

Ritchie has said this on his creative process:

My creative process has never been something I can put into words. It's very random, very scattered and can sometimes lead down dark alleyways and dead ends. What I will say is I think any director needs to immerse himself in both real life and in history to fully open up creative processes. And you must be prepared for the reality that any creative process worth its salt needs to be revised, reworked and, on occasion, thrown out the window entirely.

Ritchie has worked multiple times with Vinnie Jones, Jason Statham, Jason Flemyng, Alan Ford, Geoff Bell, Mark Strong, Jude Law, Eddie Marsan, Jared Harris, Charlie Hunnam, Josh Hartnett, and Hugh Grant.

Personal life

Ritchie started training in Shotokan karate at the age of seven at the Budokwai in London, where he later achieved a black belt in both Shotokan and Judo. He also has a black belt in Brazilian Jiu-Jitsu under Renzo Gracie.

In an interview, Ritchie revealed that he can speak Hebrew.

On 18 May 2000, Ritchie was arrested by police for allegedly assaulting a 20-year-old man outside the Kensington home he shared with American singer-songwriter Madonna. On 22 December 2000, Ritchie married Madonna at Skibo Castle in Scotland. Madonna gave birth to their son, Rocco (born 11 August 2000 in Los Angeles) and adopted a Malawian baby in 2006, David (born 24 September 2005).

Madonna filed for divorce in October 2008, citing irreconcilable differences. On 15 December 2008, Madonna's spokeswoman announced that she had agreed to a divorce settlement with Ritchie, the terms of which grant him £50–60 million, which includes the value of the couple's London pub and Wiltshire estate in England. The couple issued a joint statement calling reports of the amount of the settlement "misleading and inaccurate", and that it remains private. At the Central Family Court in Holborn, district judge Caroline Reid pronounced the decree nisi, which dissolved the marriage within six weeks. Madonna and Ritchie entered a custody agreement for their children.

In February 2011, his £6 million London home was briefly occupied by members of The Really Free School, a squatter organisation. In 2010, Ritchie met model Jacqui Ainsley and they married on 30 July 2015. The couple have three children: Rafael, Rivka and Levi, born in 2011, 2012 and 2014, respectively. In July 2020, Ritchie was given a six-month driving ban after he was caught by CyclingMikey using a mobile device while operating a motor vehicle.

Other business ventures

Ritchie owns a pub, The Lore of the Land, in London, and co-owns another, The Walmer Castle with David Beckham. Ritchie owns a small brewing company, Gritchie Brewing Company which brews beer on his Ashcombe Estate in Wiltshire. He also owns The Wild Kitchen, a firm producing outdoor cooking equipment and tents, which launched at Chelsea Flower Show in 2021.  

In October 2022 it was announced that Compton Abbas Airfield was being sold by the owners, the Hughes family, to Ritchie, who owns the neighbouring Ashcombe Estate. Ritchie will take over running of the airfield on 1 February 2023. Some of the Gritchie Brewing Company's storage facilities will be relocated to the airfield.

Ritchie became a comic writer from 2007-2008 with the release of the Virgin Comics series Guy Ritchie's Gamekeeper.

Filmography

Short film

Feature film

Cameo appearance

Television

References

External links 

 
 
 

1968 births
British film directors
Edgar Award winners
English businesspeople
English film directors
English film producers
English-language film directors
English male judoka
English male karateka
English male screenwriters
English people of Scottish descent
English practitioners of Brazilian jiu-jitsu
English screenwriters
Living people
People awarded a black belt in Brazilian jiu-jitsu
People educated at Sibford School
People educated at Stanbridge Earls School
People educated at Windlesham House School
People from Hatfield, Hertfordshire
Writers with dyslexia